Diethyl sulfate (DES) is a highly toxic, combustible, and likely carcinogenic chemical compound with the formula (C2H5)2SO4. It occurs as a colorless, oily liquid with a faint peppermint odor and is corrosive to tissue and metals. Diethyl sulfate is used as an alkylating agent to prepare ethyl derivatives of phenols, amines, and thiols. It is used to manufacture dyes and textiles.

Property 
Diethyl sulfate is moisture sensitive liquid. Heating can lead to release of toxic gases and vapors. It gets darker over time. It forms ethyl alcohol, ethyl sulfate, and eventually sulfuric acid when exposed to water. This compound is also combustible; when burned, sulfur oxides, ether, and ethylene are produced.

Toxicity 
Diethyl sulfate is a strong alkylating agent which ethylates DNA, causing both somatic and germ cell mutations, and is therefore genotoxic. According to the International Agency for Research on Cancer (IARC), as of 1999 there is not sufficient evidence for the carcinogenic properties of diethyl sulfate in humans, but there is in animals. It is classified as a Group 2A (probably carcinogenic to humans) carcinogen by the IARC. Experimentation with animals has suggested this compound is likely carcinogenic to humans as it was implicated in the development of laryngeal cancer. Evidence of the effects of this chemical compound on reproductive or developmental health is also lacking.

Inhalation of this chemical compound has potential to be fatal and can induce nausea or vomiting. Swallowing this substance could also be fatal or lead to nausea, vomiting, or severe abdominal pain. Contact with or absorption through the skin also has potential to be fatal, and can cause severe burns.

Preparation 
This compound can be prepared by absorbing ethylene into concentrated sulfuric acid or by fuming sulfuric acid into diethyl ether or ethanol and is purified using rectification in vacuo. This can be done on a large enough scale for commercial production. It can then be purchased as a technical product or for use in a laboratory setting with 99.5% purity or 95% to 98% purity respectively.

References

Further reading

External links
 
 
 

Ethylating agents
IARC Group 2A carcinogens
Ethyl esters
Sulfate esters